The Talent League (also known as the Coates Talent League under naming rights and previously as the NAB League and TAC Cup) is an under-19 Australian rules football representative competition held in Australia. It is based on geographic regions throughout country Victoria and metropolitan Melbourne with each team representing one of twelve Victorian regions, while a thirteenth team from Tasmania was reintroduced in 2019.

The competition is one of the primary sources of recruitment for Australian Football League (AFL) clubs. It provides an opportunity for talented regional players to participate in a high standard competition without having to relocate too far from their place of origin. The competition has a very successful pathway with players missing AFL selection often being recruited by semi-professional state, country and regional leagues throughout Australia. An equivalent competition for female footballers, known as the Talent League Girls, is also contested on an annual basis.

The league was known as the TAC Cup until 2018, the NAB League in 2019 to 2022, and since 2023 it has been known as the Coates Talent League.

History 

With the focus of the VFL/AFL moving rapidly towards national competition, the old metropolitan and country Victorian zoning recruitment method for VFL/AFL clubs was phased out and at the start of 1992 the league's under-19 competition was disbanded.

A new competition, administered by the Victorian State Football League and sponsored by the Transport Accident Commission, was formed as an avenue to where many young Victorian under-18 players make their transition to becoming senior Australian Football League players. In 1992 the competition consisted of five metropolitan teams and one country team. The initial teams were the Northern Knights, Eastern Ranges, Southern Stingrays (renamed the Dandenong Stingrays in 1995), Western Jets, Central Dragons (renamed the Prahran Dragons in 1995, then the Sandringham Dragons in 2000) and Geelong Falcons.

In 1993 an additional four country teams were included – the Murray Bushrangers, Bendigo Pioneers, Gippsland Power and Ballarat Rebels (renamed the North Ballarat Rebels in 1996, then the Greater Western Victoria Rebels in 2017). In 1995 two additional metropolitan regions were established with the Oakleigh Chargers and Calder Cannons teams included in the competition.

In 1995, a Tasmanian-based team, the Tassie Mariners, commenced in the competition, becoming the league's first non-Victorian side. The following year, the NSW/ACT Rams were admitted. The Mariners and Rams both exited the competition as full-time members at the end of the 2002, returning the competition to twelve teams.

The Gold Coast Football Club recruited several under-18s players in the 2008/09 summer, and participated in the TAC Cup in 2009 (before playing in the VFL in 2010 and the AFL from 2011). Similarly, the Greater Western Sydney Giants fielded a TAC Cup team in 2010, two seasons prior to its introduction to the AFL in 2012.

Four interstate teams—the Tassie Mariners, NSW/ACT Rams, Queensland Scorpions and the Northern Territory Thunder—each play a handful of games each year against TAC Cup teams, particularly in the lead-up to the annual AFL Under 18 Championships; these games are counted as part of the TAC Cup premiership season, but the interstate clubs are not eligible for the premiership.

Between 1995 and 2008, the finals system was in a knock-out format.  This reverted to a traditional finals system in 2009 with the introduction of the Gold Coast team. In 2010, this was extended to include 12 of the 13 clubs participating that season, with the extra matches forming an extended knockout format. In 2011 the finals system was reverted to the traditional eight-team AFL finals series. Prior to the 2014 season, the NSW/ACT Rams was reestablished as a TAC Cup team, with players from the Sydney Swans and Greater Western Sydney Giants young academy sides being picked for the NSW/ACT team.

From 2019, the newly named NAB League introduced six new teams: the AFL Academy sides of Gold Coast, GWS Giants, Sydney Swans, Brisbane Lions; the Northern Territory; and the returning Tassie Mariners, who were later renamed the Tasmania Devils. Additionally, teams were able to include more 19-year-olds – previously only three could be selected. The 2020 season was cancelled due to the COVID-19 pandemic, and in 2021 the competition fully transitioned from under-18s to under-19s – although the draft age to senior football remained at 18. Since 2023 the league has been primarily by under-18 players, with a selection of under-19 players also listed.

Competition timeline

Age eligibility

For many years the league was primarily a competition for 18-year-olds, though exceptions were made for bottom-aged players—16- or 17-year-olds—and since 2007, over-age players—19-year-olds—to participate in the competition. In 2021 the league shifted to an under-19 level, though the entry age for the AFL Draft remains 18.

Since the beginning of the 2007 TAC Cup season, clubs have been granted permission to select up to five over-age players permitted on their lists.

Nonetheless, age eligibility requirements remain for the AFL Draft, where players must have turned seventeen years of age by 30 April of that draft year to be eligible for selection by an AFL club.

Awards

Morrish Medal
The Morrish Medal is awarded to the best player in the competition each year. The same medal was previously awarded to the best player in the Victorian Football League Thirds/Under-19s competition, which the TAC Cup superseded.

TAC Cup Coaches Award
The TAC Cup Coaches Award is voted on by both coaches in a 5–4–3–2–1 format at the end of each game. At the end of the 2015 season, the award was discontinued.

Coverage

All matches are live streamed on the AFL app.

Former coverage included:

 The Match of the Round being broadcast live on Rumble 103, an internet radio station based in Melbourne.
 A TAC Cup show screening on Channel 9 in Melbourne and across Victoria and Inland NSW border regions on WIN Television from 1 p.m. every Sunday from late March until the end of September.
 TAC Cup news and results being seen on C31's Local Footy Show and heard on the ABC's Triple J radio station.
 TAC Cup matches were broadcast live on Channel C31 Melbourne television in Melbourne, Geelong & regional Victoria in 2010.
 Radio stations SYN FM & RRR FM broadcast coverage of TAC Cup football matches every weekend during the season.

Clubs history

Clubs

VFL Affiliations
Nine of the 12 Victorian-based NAB League clubs are affiliated with a heritage VFA/VFL club. This allows for a natural development pathway between under-18s football and state-level senior football; and top age players are permitted to play senior games under the VFL's 23rd man rule:

 Calder Cannons - Coburg Lions
 Dandenong Stingrays - Frankston Football Club
 Eastern Ranges - Box Hill Hawks
 Geelong Falcons - Werribee Tigers
 Gippsland Power - Casey Demons
 Northern Knights - Preston Football Club
 Oakleigh Chargers - Port Melbourne Borough
 Sandringham Dragons - Sandringham Zebras
 Western Jets - Williamstown Seagulls

NAB League premiers

Total premierships by club

6 – Calder Cannons
5 – Oakleigh Chargers
4 – Northern Knights, Sandringham Dragons
3 – Geelong Falcons
2 – Eastern Ranges, Murray Bushrangers
1 – Dandenong Stingrays, Gippsland Power, Greater Western Victoria Rebels
0 – Bendigo Pioneers, Western Jets

NSW/ACT Rams, as of 2015, do not play a full season, and therefore cannot compete for the premiership.

Total runner-up placements by club

6 – Dandenong Stingrays
5 - Eastern Ranges
3 – Murray Bushrangers, Calder Cannons, Gippsland Power
2 – Oakleigh Chargers, Geelong Falcons, Western Jets
1 – Sandringham Dragons, Bendigo Pioneers, NSW/ACT Rams
0 – Greater Western Victoria Rebels, Northern Knights

NAB League Girls 

A female youth competition, equivalent to the NAB League, was inaugurated in 2017.

External links
Official website
TAC Cup history

References

 
Australian rules football competitions in Victoria (Australia)
Recurring sporting events established in 1992
1992 establishments in Australia
Sports leagues established in 1992
Articles which contain graphical timelines
NAB League Girls